Wind-up or windup may refer to:
 Windup, a pitching position in baseball
 "Wind Up", a 1971 song from Aqualung (Jethro Tull album)
 "Wind Up", a 1997 song by Foo Fighters from The Colour and the Shape
 "Wind Up", a 2001 song by Thursday from Full Collapse
 Windup radio, a clockwork radio powered by human muscle action
 Wind-up Records, a New York music label
 Wind-up toy, a toy powered by a wound clockwork motor
 Winding-up, liquidation of a company
 Integral windup, an error condition in a proportional–integral–derivative controller
 Pain wind-up, an increase in pain intensity caused by repeated stimulation
 "She's a Windup", a 1977 song by Dr. Feelgood
 The Wind-Up Bird Chronicle, a 1994 Japanese novel by Haruki Murakami

See also 
 Wind (disambiguation)
 Wind It Up (disambiguation)
 Wound (disambiguation)